Necmettin Imac (born February 18, 1987 in Amsterdam) is a midfielder who is currently playing for Cambuur Leeuwarden. He is a citizen of The Netherlands.

Description
Necmettin Imac is an explosive midfielder who can create space and distribute the ball accurately around the pitch. He has very good vision and ability with the ball.

International
Necmettin Imac has played with the U16 Netherlands national football team 9 times, scoring 4 goals.

References
 Info on Necmettin from the Official Cambuur Website

1987 births
Living people
Dutch footballers
Association football midfielders
SC Cambuur players
Footballers from Amsterdam